Matthew J. Burger is a United States Air Force major general who serves as deputy to the chief of Air Force Reserve since August 2022. He most recently served as the deputy commander of the Air Force Reserve Command from 2020 to 2022. Prior to that, he was the director of air, space, and information operations of the same command.

References

External links 
 

Living people
Year of birth missing (living people)
Place of birth missing (living people)
United States Air Force generals
Major generals